Peter Karageorgevitch may refer to:

 Peter I of Serbia (1844–1921)
 Peter II of Yugoslavia (1923–1970)
 Prince Peter of Yugoslavia (born 1980)